Saveri (pronounced sāvēri) is a Carnatic music ragam. This raga is a janya of the 15th Melakarta raga Mayamalavagowla. This raga brings out karuna rasa, i.e. it brings  mood of compassion.

Structure and Lakshana

This ragam is an Audava-Sampurna ragam (five notes in the ascending scale and seven notes in the descending scale).

: 
: 

The notes are shuddha rishabham, shuddha madhyamam and shuddha dhaivatam in ascending scale and kakali nishadam, shuddha dhaivatam, shuddha madhyamam, antara gandharam and shuddha rishabham in descent. The two swaras which give the raga such a characteristic are R (Rishabham) and D (Dhaivatham).

Select compositions

Sarasuda, a varnam composed by Kotavasal Venkatarama Iyer, set to Adi tala
Sankari Sankuru, Durusuga and Janani Natajana composed by Shyama Sastri
Bhavayaami Raghuraamam (first raga used in this ragamalika), Anjaneya Raghuraamam, Paripahi Ganadhipa, Pahimam Sripadmanabha and Devi Pavane (Navarathri third day krithi) by Maharaja Swathi Thirunal
Rama Bana, Tulasi Jagajjanani and Daridapu Leka – Adi Tala composed by Thyagaraja
Kari Kalabha Mukham in Tisra Ekam composed by Muthuswamy Dikshitar
Sri Rajagopala in Adi composed by Muthuswamy Dikshitar
Etu Namminavo Manasa by Patnam Subramania Iyer 
Pahimam Girithanaye and Somapoma composed by Irayimman Thampi
Velayya Daya composed by Koteeswara Iyer
Sriramula divyanama by Bhadrachala Ramadasu
Murugu Muruga by Periyasaamy Thooran
Venkataramanane baro, Parakumadade, Barayya Venkataramana by Purandaradasa
Bhasurangi Bale and Hemopameyaangi two padams by Swathi Thirunal
Janakasutha a Geetham
 Kapali iruka, muruga Muzhumathi by Papanasam sivan

Related rāgams 
This section covers the theoretical and scientific aspect of this rāgam.

Scale similarities 
Karnataka Shuddha Saveri is a pentatonic scale which has a symmetric descending scale as the ascending scale, which is same as the ascending scale of Saveri, while Saveri has a sampurna descending scale. Its  structure is S R1 M1 P D1 S : S D1 P M1 R1 S
Malahari is a audava-shadava scale (5 notes in ascending and 6 in descending scale) that resembles Saveri. Its ascending scale has shuddha madhyamam in place of antara gandharam, while the nishadham is dropped in descending scale. Its  structure is S R1 M1 P D1 S : S D1 P M1 G3 R1 S

Notes

References

Janya ragas